José Rafael Ruiz Aparicio (born October 21, 1994) is a Venezuelan professional baseball pitcher for the Chicago White Sox of Major League Baseball (MLB). He previously played for the San Diego Padres.

Career

San Diego Padres
Ruiz signed with the San Diego Padres as an international free agent in July 2011. He started his career as a catcher, before converting into a pitcher during the 2016 season. The Padres added him to their 40-man roster after the 2016 season.

Ruiz started 2017 with the Lake Elsinore Storm and was called up to the Padres on July 24. In his major league debut, Ruiz pitched a scoreless 9th, striking out 1 and walking 1. He struck out Yoenis Céspedes for his first strikeout. Ruiz was sent back down to Lake Elsinore the following day. On December 15, 2017, Ruiz was designated for assignment by the Padres.

Chicago White Sox
He was claimed off waivers by the Chicago White Sox on December 22, 2017. He began 2018 with the Winston-Salem Dash. On September 4, 2018, he was called up to the major leagues. 

With the 2020 Chicago White Sox, Ruiz appeared in 5 games, compiling a 0-0 record with 2.25 ERA and 5 strikeouts in four innings pitched.  In 2021, Ruiz had a great season despite a record of 1-3. He had an ERA of 3.05 in 59 games while pitching in 65 innings and striking out 63 batters.

On January 13, 2023, Ruiz agreed to a one-year, $925K contract with the White Sox, avoiding salary arbitration.

References

External links

1994 births
Living people
Arizona League Padres players
Birmingham Barons players
Chicago White Sox players
Dominican Summer League Padres players
Venezuelan expatriate baseball players in the Dominican Republic
Eugene Emeralds players
Fort Wayne TinCaps players
Lake Elsinore Storm players
Major League Baseball pitchers
Major League Baseball players from Venezuela
Navegantes del Magallanes players
People from Carabobo
San Diego Padres players
Tri-City Dust Devils players
Venezuelan expatriate baseball players in the United States
Winston-Salem Dash players
Yaquis de Obregón players
Venezuelan expatriate baseball players in Mexico
2023 World Baseball Classic players